Back in the Day may refer to:

Film, television, theatre and comics 
 Back in the Day (2005 film), an American crime drama starring Ja Rule
 Back in the Day (2014 film), an American comedy starring and directed by Michael Rosenbaum
 Back in the Day (2016 film), an American sports drama film starring William DeMeo
 Back in the Day (game show), a 2005 British comedy quiz programme
 Back in the Day (2006 TV program), an American program repackaging the 1960s and '70s show Car and Track
 Back in the Day (TV series), a sports nostalgia series on ESPN Classic
 Back in the Day, a 2007 musical by Lance Horne
 Back in the Day, a comic strip on GoComics

Music

Albums 
 Back in the Day: The Best of Bootsy, by Bootsy Collins, 1994
 Back in the Day, by G. Love & Special Sauce, 1993

Songs 
 "Back in the Day" (Ahmad song), 1994
 "Back in the Day" (Illegal song), 1994
 "Back in the Day" (Missy Elliott song), 2003
 "Back in the Day (Puff)", by Erykah Badu, 2003
 "Back in the Day", by Bif Naked, 2004
 "Back in the Day", by Blues Traveler from Bridge, 2001
 "Back in the Day", by Buckcherry from 15, 2005
 "Back in the Day", by Christina Aguilera from Back to Basics, 2006
 "Back in the Day", by Dred Scott from Breakin' Combs, 1994
 "Back in the Day", by Megadeth from The System Has Failed, 2004
 "Back in the Day", by Sugababes from The Lost Tapes, 2022
 "Back in the Day", by Wayne Brady from A Long Time Coming, 2008

See also 
 Nostalgia